Cynthia "Cindy" Reinhart-King is an American biomedical engineer who is a University Distinguished Professor at Vanderbilt University. Her research considers cell motility and adhesion. She serves as president of the Biomedical Engineering Society.

Early life and education 
Reinhart King studied chemical engineering and biology at Massachusetts Institute of Technology. She studied integrin-mediated signalling alongside Doug Lauffenburger. Integrin-mediated signalling describes the molecular signals that are initiated when an extracellular ligand binds to an integrin on the cellular surface, resulting in the regulation of a downstream cellular process. After graduating, she joined the University of Pennsylvania as a doctoral student, where she worked on cell adhesion in the endothelium. She moved to the University of Rochester for postdoctoral research, studying atherosclerosis with Bradford Berk.

Research and career 
Reinhart King's research has helped understanding of cancer progression. She has monitored disease progression at the molecular, cellular and tissue level. Her analytical strategy combines cellular imaging with mechanical measurements, histology and biochemical assays. She showed how the cellular matrix stiffens after tumour formation, promoting tumour growth and impacting the effectiveness of cancer treatments. Her lab have demonstrated that although cancer cells move quickly during metastasis, their migration through the body occurs via the most easy pathways. In particular, they favor wider spaces that are easier navigated than smaller and more confined ones.

Reinhart King has also investigated diabetic retinopathy. This condition can cause blindness in diabetic patients. She started her independent scientific career at Cornell University.

In 2021, Reinhart King became President Elect of the Biomedical Engineering Society. She was made Senior Associate Dean for Research at Vanderbilt University in 2022. She has been involved with science policy, serving as an expert advisor to the federal government of the United States on biotechnology and biomanufacturing.

Awards and honors 
 2010 Rita Schaffer Young Investigator Award
 2011 NSF Faculty Early Career Award
 2016 Elected Fellow of the American Institute for Medical and Biological Engineering
 2017 Elected Fellow of the Biomedical Engineering Society
 2016 National Academy of Engineering Frontiers Fellow
 2018 Biomedical Engineering Society Mid-Career Award
 2018 National Academies of Sciences, Engineering, and Medicine Inaugural New Voices Fellow
 2019 Grace Hopper Distinguished Lecture
 2022 Elected President of the Biomedical Engineering Society

Selected publications

Personal life 
Reinhart-King is married to Michael King, the J. Lawrence Wilson Professor of Engineering at Vanderbilt University. Together they have two children.

References 

Year of birth missing (living people)
Living people
American biomedical engineers
American women engineers
21st-century American engineers
21st-century women engineers
Massachusetts Institute of Technology alumni
University of Pennsylvania alumni
University of Rochester alumni
Cornell University faculty
Vanderbilt University faculty
Fellows of the American Institute for Medical and Biological Engineering
Fellows of the Biomedical Engineering Society
21st-century American women scientists